The Norwegian Trotting Association (DNT) is the sports federation organizing horse racing in Norway. It is an umbrella for the 13 regional federations and 185 local chapters with 17,000 members. Tote betting takes place at eleven harness race courses and one gallop races course, Øvrevoll Galoppbane, all owned by the association. The betting is organized through the association-owned company Norsk Rikstoto. In 2009 the association organized 556 race days, with 4,652 races taking place in 2008. It organizes 5,500 active racehorses, 200 professional trainers, 60 assistant trainers and 3,000 amateur trainers.

Horse racing in Norway has traditionally taken place on frozen lakes and home from church on Sundays. DNT was established in 1875. In 1928 horse betting was legalized and Bjerke Travbane in Oslo opened. DNT became a founding member of the European Trotting Union in 1973. Norsk Rikstoto was established in 1982 and opened for a national off-track betting. Betting revenue totaled 3.2 billion Norwegian krone in 2008. Races are broadcast on Rikstoto Direkte.

Courses

The following is a list of harness racing tracks in Norway which had tote betting races in 2012. Revenue is measured in millions of Norwegian krone.

References

Horse racing in Norway
Trotting
Organisations based in Oslo
1875 establishments in Norway
Sports organizations established in 1875